Sabotsy Ambohitromby is a rural commune in Analamanga Region, in the  Central Highlands of Madagascar. It belongs to the district of Andramasina and its populations numbers to 16,471 in 2018.

References

ADOPTION DES LUTTES ANTI-EROSIVES PAR LES PAYSANS: ETUDE DE CAS DANS LA COMMUNE RURALE DE SABOTSY AMBOHITROMBY

External links

Populated places in Analamanga
mg:Sabotsy Ambohitromby